The 2016–17 ISU Season's World Ranking is based on the results of the 2016–17 season only.

Season's World Ranking 
The remainder of this section is a complete list, by discipline, published by the ISU.

Men's singles (135 skaters)

Ladies' singles (153 skaters)

Pairs (84 couples)

Ice dance (108 couples)

See also 
 ISU World Standings and Season's World Ranking
 List of highest ranked figure skaters by nation
 List of ISU World Standings and Season's World Ranking statistics
 2016–17 figure skating season
 2016–17 synchronized skating season

References

External links 
 International Skating Union
 ISU World standings for Single & Pair Skating and Ice Dance / ISU Season's World Ranking
 ISU World standings for Synchronized Skating

ISU World Standings and Season's World Ranking
Standings and Ranking
Standings and Ranking